Rewind is a 2013 made-for-television science fiction film which served as the pilot episode of an unaired television show. It premiered in the United States in August 2013.

Plot
The film opens with an apparent terrorist attack involving a nuclear device which destroys New York City, killing nine million people. The perpetrator, Benjamin Rourke, a Nobel Prize-winning physicist, had become embittered by the death of his wife. Having learned of a potential time travel experiment in progress, he engineered the bomb plot to force the US Government to send agents back to prevent the disaster from happening. He had also arranged matters that the only way to do this was to have them prevent his wife's death. The story describes the process of the team, CIA agents Sean Knox and Danny Gates, and scientist Lyndsay Bryce, arriving at this conclusion and their efforts without doing too much damage to the time-line.

Cast
Shane McRae as Shaun Knox
Jennifer Ferrin as Dr. Lyndsay Bryce 
Robbie Jones as Danny Gates
Jeff Fahey as Ellis
Keon Alexander as Charlie
Keisha Castle Hughes as Priya
Matthew Bennett as John Malcolm
David Cronenberg as Benjamin Rourke

See also
Timeless (TV series)

References

External links

Television films as pilots
Television pilots not picked up as a series
2013 television films
2013 films
American science fiction television films
Films about time travel
2010s American films